Montegrosso or Monte Grosso may refer to:

Montegrosso, a French municipality in Corsica
Monte Grosso, a French mountain in Corsica
Montegrosso d'Asti, an Italian municipality in Piedmont